Anthony Ward (born 1957) is a British theatre designer specializing in set and costume design. He studied theatre design at Wimbledon School of Art.

He has designed productions for the Royal National Theatre, Royal Shakespeare Company, Donmar Warehouse and the Almeida Theatre.  Recent productions include the revival of Stephen Sondheim’s play Sweeney Todd, directed by Jonathan Kent (Chichester Festival Theatre/Adelphi Theatre), Posh (Royal Court/Duke of York Theatre), Enron (Royal Court/Chichester Festival Theatre). Ward's West End musical credits include My Fair Lady, Oklahoma!, Oliver! and Chitty Chitty Bang Bang.

Ward designed Sam Mendes' inaugural production, Assassins, at the Donmar Warehouse and Mary Stuart, directed by Phyllida Lloyd, which transferred to the West End and Broadway and received a Tony Award for Best Costume Design.

Opera productions include productions of Gloriana and Peter Grimes directed by Phyllida Lloyd for Opera North, and  Il ritorno d'Ulisse in patria directed by Adrian Noble  for the Festival d'Aix-en-Provence.

For dance he designed Matthew Bourne’s Nutcracker! (Sadler’s Wells and UK tour) and most recently The Nutcracker for Nikolaj Hübbe at the Royal Danish Ballet.

Awards and nominations
Awards include:

(2009) Tony Award Best Costume Design of a Play for Mary Stuart,
(2008) Touring Broadway Award for Best Set &Costume Design My Fair Lady.
(2003) OBIE Award Set Design Uncle Vanya, 
(2003) What’s on Stage Theatregoers Choice Award for Set Design Chitty Chitty Bang Bang 
(2001) Outer Critics Circle Award  for Set Design Oklahoma!, 
(1999) Olivier Award for Set Design Oklahoma!
(1996) Olivier Award for Costume Design Midsummer Night’s Dream, La Grande Magia & The Way of the World

Nominations include:

Olivier Award Nomination: 
(2006) for Best Costume Design Mary Stuart
(2003) Best Set Design for Chitty Chitty Bang Bang
(2002) Best Set & Costume Design for My Fair Lady 
(1995) Best Set Design for The Tempest 
(1994) Best Set & Costume Design for The Winter’s Tale

Tony Award Nominations: 
(2007/8) Macbeth Set design  
(2004/05)  Set Design  Chitty Chitty Bang Bang
(1995/96) Set design A Midsummer Night’s Dream

Drama Desk Award Nominations: 
(2004/2005) Outstanding Set and Costume Design for Chitty Chitty Bang Bang, (2001/2002) Outstanding Set Design for Oklahoma!'
Evening Standard Award Nominations:
(2007) Best Set Design for Macbeth''.

References

External links 

Variety
Oliver! West End Official Website

British scenic designers
British costume designers
Living people
Tony Award winners
Alumni of Wimbledon College of Arts
1957 births